Woodford State Fish and Wildlife Area is an Illinois state park on  of area Woodford County, Illinois, United States.  Most of this protected area is over the Goose Lake and Upper Peoria Lake sections of the Illinois River.

References

Illinois River
State parks of Illinois
Protected areas of Woodford County, Illinois